Fuck the World is the fourth EP by American R&B singer Brent Faiyaz, released February 7, 2020, by Lost Kids.

Singles 
The EP was preceded by the singles "Fuck the World (Summer in London)", released July 22, 2019; and "Rehab (Winter in Paris)", released September 21, with an accompanying music video released December 29. A third single, a remix of "Fuck the World" featured 2 Chainz, was released July 24, 2020.

Style and reception 

AllMusic's Andy Kellman called the project "not quite as malevolent as the title indicates" and "a little more openhearted than Faiyaz's earlier output", though still with "flashes of the cynical outlook and more of the remorseless (if sensitively delivered) slow jams for which he's known." Exclaim!s A. Harmony wrote that Faiyaz "blends the bitter with the sweet" on the EP where he "perfects his knack for juxtaposition by mixing aggressive, rap-leaning quips with dulcet tones that, together, create a unique sound only he can deliver." Faiyaz "tackles romance-centred songs with compelling specificity. But unlike other R&B albums, his imagination doesn't stop at relationship issues: Faiyaz also explores themes like trauma, depression and self-development, which keeps the album from getting boring." The EP offers "lots to enjoy here for old and new fans alike."

Pitchforks Alphonse Pierre noted that "there's a lot of slow-groove R&B right now", but that while Faiyaz is "often lumped into this scene ... he doesn't deserve to be" because, unlike other releases in the scene, this EP "starts to sound like a horror story" where "sex is a game and there are no consequences for anything" after listening long enough. Faiyaz is "at his best when he's cold-hearted" and "remarkably consistent as a songwriter" with the project's weakest point being "Soon Az I Get Home (Interlude)", "mostly because of its brevity".

Year-end lists

Commercial performance
Fuck the World debuted at number 20 on the US Billboard 200 chart. The EP also debuted at number 12 on the US Top R&B/Hip-Hop Albums chart. On December 8, 2022, the EP was certified gold by the Recording Industry Association of America (RIAA) for combined sales and album-equivalent units of over 500,000 units. To date, the EP has earned 684,000 album-equivalent units and a total of 935.81 million official on-demand streams in the United States.

Track listing

Charts

Certifications

References 

2020 EPs
Brent Faiyaz albums
Contemporary R&B albums by American artists